Symplocos colombonensis is a plant in the family Symplocaceae, native to Borneo. It is named for the Colombon River in Sabah.

Description
The brown twigs have a zig-zag shape. The inflorescences feature racemes of three flowers.

Distribution and habitat
Symplocos colombonensis is endemic to Borneo, where it is confined to Mount Kinabalu in Sabah.

References

colombonensis
Endemic flora of Borneo
Flora of Mount Kinabalu
Plants described in 1975